The 12961 / 12962 Avantika Superfast Express is a Superfast train belonging to Indian Railways that runs between  and  in India. It is a daily service. It operates as train number 12961 from Mumbai Central to Indore and as train number 12962 in the reverse direction.

Gallery

Background 
When this train was introduced back in 1985 it was called as Bombay–Indore Superfast. Later it was renamed as Avantika Superfast Express.

The name Avantika is from 'Avanti', the former name of Ujjain, a historical city located near Indore. This is one of the two Superfast train connections between Indore and Mumbai, the other train is Indore Duronto Express.

In February 2019, it was upgraded to LHB coach.

Coaches
Coach composition may be amended at the discretion of Indian Railways depending on demand.
In February 2019, it was upgraded to LHB coach from ICF coach.

*Note – The coach composition shown here is for 12961 (Mumbai to Indore).For 12962 (Indore to Mumbai) the composition will be flipped.

Service

It is a daily train & covers the distance of 829 kilometres in 12 hours 10 mins as 12961 Avantika Express (68 km/hr) & 13 hours 5 mins as 12962 Avantika Express (64 km/hr).

Schedule

Locomotive link
When Avantika Superfast was first introduced it was hauled by WDM-2 for whole journey.

After some time, WCAM-1 became its regular link from Mumbai Central till Ujjain, After Ujjain WDM-2 hauled it complete its journey to Indore.

When Mumbai's WR was converted into AC current, WAP-4 took incharge of Avantika till Ujjain. After sometime Ujjain–Indore line got electrified and WAP-4 hauled it for whole journey.

After some years, Avantika SuperFast got India's fastest locomotive WAP-5 for its regular link.

When Avantika SuperFast got upgraded into LHB coach in 2018 February, its regular link also got upgraded into WAP-7 (usually HOG mode).

All the diesel locomotives were provided by Ratlam Loco Shed (RTM)
All the DC-traction electric locomotives were provided by Valsad Loco Shed (BL)
All the AC-traction electric locomotives are provided by Vadodara Loco Shed (BRC)

References

External links
Avantika Express India Rail Info
https://expresstrainroute.com/trains/12961-avantika-sf-express

Express trains in India
Rail transport in Madhya Pradesh
Rail transport in Gujarat
Rail transport in Maharashtra
Transport in Mumbai
Transport in Indore
Transport in Ujjain
1985 establishments in Maharashtra
Railway services introduced in 1985
Named passenger trains of India